United States military occupation may refer to:

 A state or period of occupation by the United States military, such as those listed at List of military occupations
 A pejorative term for any activity during the military history of the United States which involved troops in other countries
 A job in the United States Armed Forces, as designated by its United States military occupation code